Urbain Anseeuw (5 January 1892 – 9 March 1962) was a Belgian racing cyclist. He rode in the 1919 Tour de France.

References

1892 births
1962 deaths
Belgian male cyclists
Place of birth missing